Bravia was a Portuguese vehicle manufacturer. It started by reconditioning military vehicles and by 1964 it had become a manufacturer in its own right. Its best known product is the wheeled APC Bravia Chaimite.

Vehicle Models
 Bravia Elefante 6X6
 Bravia Leopardo 6X6
 Bravia Gazela 4X4
 Bravia Pantera 6X6
 Bravia Tigre 6X6
 Bravia Kaiser Jeep M-201 4X4
 Bravia Comando MK III Armoured Car 4X4
 Bravia Chaimite Armoured Personnel Carrier 4X4

See also
 Military of Portugal
Weapons of the Lebanese Civil War

References
Christopher F. Foss, Jane's Tank & Combat Vehicle recognition guide, HarperCollins Publishers, London 2002. 
Denis Miller, The Illustrated Encyclopedia of Trucks and Buses, New Burlington Books, London 1982.
Pedro Manuel Monteiro, Berliet, Chaimite e UMM – Os Grandes Veículos Militares Nacionais, Contra a Corrente, Lisboa 2018.  (Portuguese/English text)

Car manufacturers of Portugal
Defunct manufacturing companies of Portugal
Defunct truck manufacturers
Defence companies of Portugal